Once Upon a Time in Amedica is the fifth album released by rapper, Young Bleed. It was released on September 11, 2007 for West Coast Mafia Records and was executively produced by C-Bo and Roy Jones Jr., with additional production by Timmy Fingerz and Chris Godbey. Once Upon a Time in Amedica did rather well compared to his previous album, peaking at #48 on the Top R&B/Hip-Hop Albums and #25 on the Rap Albums charts.

Track listing
"Bac Road Mississippi"- 5:10 (Featuring Money Waters & Ol' Mann)
"U' Kno' Meh'"- 3:25  
"Top Back"- 4:07 (Featuring 8Ball) 
"Doin' Me!"- 4:46 (Featuring Rich Boy) 
"Sound Uh Da' City"- 3:58  
"Arch' Criminal"- 4:15  
"Shake Sump'n' Fa' Meh'- 3:39 (Featuring Choppa) 
"Bounce It"- 4:03 (Featuring Juvenile) 
"N' Da' Street"- 4:56  
"Tumble' N' Down"- 4:39  
"People!"- 5:15  
"Gangstas' & Ballas"- 4:19 (Featuring C-Bo) 
"Musik N' Money"- 3:03 (Featuring David Banner) 
"Tear Dis' M-F Up!"- 5:02  (Featuring Blazzak Mann)
"Life Ain't Change"- 4:52 (Featuring Trae) 
"Ona' Low"- 3:18  
"Tear It Down"- 4:07 (Featuring Ol' Mann & Loaded)

References

2007 albums
Young Bleed albums